Ada Foah is a town on the southeast coast of Ghana, where the Volta River meets the Atlantic Ocean. The town is located along the Volta River, off of the Accra-Aflao motorway. Known for palm-lined beaches and estuary islands, Ada Foah is also the capital of the Ada East District  (formerly Dangme East District) and the seat of the District Assembly.

History
The Dutch were the first to open trade between Europe and Ada in the 16th century and built a new trading post here in 1775. Later, the Danes took over, who at this time had power over the whole coast east of Accra. They remained in Ada for more than a century and had business relationships with the locals. To defend their trading post against the attacking neighboring tribes, the Danes built Fort Kongenstein in 1783.  This fort gave Ada Foah its name: Ada Fort, village of the fort.

Only traces of Fort Kongenstein are found in Ada, in the Greater Accra Region. The port of Ada is located at the mouth of the Volta River. Ada has both beaches and riverfront scenery. The fort built by the Danish in 1783 was purchased by the English on March 15, 1850. Ada people were sold and shipped to the Americas through this fort as slaves. The fort has almost disappeared into the sea.

When the British arrived at the end of the 19th century, the Danish sold their forts and trading posts to them. That was the time independence ended and British Colonial Rule was imposed. During this time of trading with the Europeans, Ada also became a major market for the slave trade. After the slave trade had been abolished, the Dangmes traded products of the African tropical forests (mostly palm oil, palm kernels and rubber).

Ada used to be a major trading center and trade was one of the main sources of income. There were large warehouses for storing the trading goods close to the seaside. Its location at the estuary ensured a quick transportation along the Volta River up to the north of the country.  The economic activities reached a peak around 1901 when a transportation system called the Volta River Transport System was launched.

Ada today

Today, Ada is a shadow of its former self as far as social life and economic activities are concerned. There are hardly any traces of physical structures such as forts, factories and shops remaining, since large parts of the town have been eroded and washed into the sea. 
Especially with the start of the cocoa industry, Ada lost its importance, since cocoa was transported on the road instead of the river and was harvested far away from the Volta River. Also, the construction of the hydroelectric dam in Akosombo dried up the Volta River and ships could no longer pass.

Tourism

Ada Foah is the tourism center of the Ada East District with its beaches, the estuary and many tourism attractions and services. With the river and the ocean, Ada Foah is famous for water sports like swimming, sailing, fishing and boat cruises. The river shore is mostly blocked by holiday chalets as many people from Accra use the place as a weekend getaway. There is a ferry and boat harbor at the riverside where boats can be rented for a cruise around the islands in the river. The Ghana Sailing Club, located at the Volta River, is open to members only.

Trasacco Estates Development Company, a real estate developer based in Ghana, is currently developing a private residence project known as Ada Turtle Bay. The project includes 40 private villas and a Hilton Resort and Spa. The project intends to boost tourism and employment in the region.

Sights

Although the old trading fort, built by Danish traders in the 18th century, is already halfway eroded and washed into the ocean, the remains can still be visited.

Close to the fort is the Presbyterian Church that was built by the first generation of Ghanaian Christians. Next to it is the old missionary cemetery. When the missionaries came to Ghana in the 19th century, they faced harsh conditions that they were not adapted to. Many died very young of various tropical diseases.

Markets
Every Wednesday at 8am and 3pm the ferry takes passengers to Anyanui on the other side of the Volta River and returns around 1pm and 6pm. The ferry connects the markets in Anyanui and in Ada Foah that both take place every Wednesday. In Ada Foah, there is an additional market on Saturday.

Services

There are many guesthouses catering for the uprising holiday destination. Most of the accommodations are budget, but there are also a number of luxury hotels. A health center is located on Clinic Road, close to Clinic Junction. The big District Hospital is not far away between Big Ada and Kasseh on the main road.

Events
Ada Foah is the secondary venue of the annual Asafotufiami Festival that takes place during the first week of August. Its main venue is Big Ada but many celebrations also take place in Ada Foah.

There is a beach soccer tournament on the first weekend of each month at the seaside near the estuary, where teams from different communities in the district compete against each other. Before the start of the tournament, the beach is cleaned, which is the underlying intention of the whole event. Once a month, there is a symposium on the ferry that operates between Ada Foah and Anyanui. This is to inform both locals and tourists about specific topics concerning health, tradition and education.

A boat race takes place every year in December. Paddle boats for 5 or 15 people compete against each other. Visitors can watch the race and also participate if they register as a group about a week in advance.

Getting there
There is a regular tro tro connection from Accra (Tudu Station) and Kasseh to Ada Foah. To get to the other side of the Volta River, there is a ferry connection to and from Anyanui.

Geography

Climate
Tropical savanna climates have monthly mean temperature above 18 °C (64 °F) in every month of the year and typically a pronounced dry season, with the driest month having precipitation less than 60 mm (2.36 in) of precipitation. The Köppen climate classification subtype for this climate is Aw, tropical savanna climate.

References

External links
 
Ada Tourism official website

Populated places in the Greater Accra Region